Carisbrooke Station was a railway station situated near the village of Carisbrooke, just outside Newport, Isle of Wight, off the south coast of England. It was an intermediate station on the Freshwater, Yarmouth and Newport Railway. It originally had 2 platforms but one platform was abandoned in 1927. It was a busy station for the nearby castle until the advent of the bus routes, but little used thereafter. Closed in 1953, its goods yard was by then derelict and overgrown (its only recent use having been by prisoners during World War II). The station has long been demolished and the site is no longer clearly discernible within a school playing field amongst modern development.

See also 

 List of closed railway stations in Britain

References 

Disused railway stations on the Isle of Wight
Former Freshwater, Yarmouth and Newport Railway stations
Railway stations in Great Britain opened in 1889
Railway stations in Great Britain closed in 1953